Hyloscirtus criptico is a species of tree frog native to Ecuador. It can be found in forests in the Andes at elevations of 2175–2794 meters.

Description 
Hyloscirtus criptico is a large frog, with robust limbs. On the sides, black and white bands are present. Orange flecks are present around the dorsum.

References 

Hyloscirtus
Frogs of South America
Amphibians of Ecuador
Endemic fauna of Ecuador
Amphibians described in 2012